Jovan Drobnjak (born 15 July 1974) is a retired Serbian football striker.

References

1974 births
Living people
People from Mojkovac
Serbian footballers
FK Beograd players
ND Gorica players
NK Korotan Prevalje players
Dunaújváros FC players
Budapest Honvéd FC players
Békéscsaba 1912 Előre footballers
KF Vllaznia Shkodër players
FK Partizani Tirana players
AZAL PFK players
Nemzeti Bajnokság I players
Association football forwards
Serbian expatriate footballers
Expatriate footballers in Slovenia
Serbian expatriate sportspeople in Slovenia
Expatriate footballers in Hungary
Serbian expatriate sportspeople in Hungary
Expatriate footballers in Albania
Serbian expatriate sportspeople in Albania
Expatriate footballers in Azerbaijan
Serbian expatriate sportspeople in Azerbaijan